Trypauchenichthys is a genus of gobies native to fresh, brackish and marine waters along the Indian Ocean and Pacific coasts of Asia.

Species
There are currently three recognized species in this genus:
 Trypauchenichthys larsonae Murdy, 2008
 Trypauchenichthys sumatrensis Hardenberg, 1931
 Trypauchenichthys typus Bleeker, 1860

References

Amblyopinae